Martin Lee Ka-shing (born 1971) is the co-chairman of Henderson Land Development, a property developer in Hong Kong, and the Hong Kong and China Gas Company Limited.

Personal life
Lee was born in Hong Kong. He is the younger son of Lee Shau Kee, the founder and chairman of Henderson Land Development. He married Cathy Chui, a former TVB actress, in Australia in 2006; they have two daughters and two sons.

References

1971 births
Living people
Hong Kong chief executives
Hong Kong real estate businesspeople
Henderson Land Development
Wilfrid Laurier University alumni
Members of the Election Committee of Hong Kong, 2017–2021
Members of the Election Committee of Hong Kong, 2021–2026